Mikhail Kozlovskiy (Russian: Михаил Сергеевич Козловский, born 17 October 1989 in Leningrad) is a Russian auto racing driver. He won the Russian Touring Car Championship in 2010 (RTCC – Touring-Light). He currently races in the World Touring Car Championship with Lada Sport Lukoil.

Racing career

World Touring Car Championship

Lada Sport Lukoil (2013–2014) / Lada Sport Rosneft (2015)

Kozlovskiy was brought in to the Lada Sport Lukoil team prior to the second round of the 2013 World Touring Car Championship season in Morocco to replace Aleksey Dudukalo in their second Lada Granta WTCC alongside experienced touring car driver James Thompson.

"Mikhail is a young, talented driver. I am sure he will be able to adapt to the car, the team and WTCC the format," team manager Viktor Shapovalov said. I am confident that our partnership in WTCC will be successful."

"Each touring car driver dreams of [racing in the] WTCC and I am no exception", Kozlovskiy said.

He scored his best finish at the opening event of the 2014 season in Morocco, finishing fifth in race two.

Kozlovskiy was the team's top finisher at Spa-Francorchamps in 2014.

Kozlovskiy represented the WTCC at the official launch of the Moscow Raceway.

European Production Series

Lukoil-Sunred (2011) 
2011 was the first international Touring Car season for Kozlovskiy, where he proved himself winning 4 races out of 6, alongside Marcos De Diego.

RTCC

Lukoil Racing Team (2009 - 2010) - Touring Light 
In 2009, Kozlovskiy joined Lukoil Racing Team and became a Russian Vice-Champion in the first year with the team.

Kozlovskiy claimed his first title becoming the Russian Champion in 2010.

Manuscript Sport / Sport Garage (2008) 
Seat Leon Cup Russia - Winner

RTCC, Touring - 3rd place

Racing record

Complete World Touring Car Championship results
(key) (Races in bold indicate pole position) (Races in italics indicate fastest lap)

References

External links

 https://www.speedracing.com.br/seat-leon-russia-supercup-mikhail-kozlovsky-e-o-primeiro-campeao-da-historia/
Profile at fiawtcc.com

1989 births
Russian racing drivers
World Touring Car Championship drivers
Living people
Sportspeople from Saint Petersburg
Russian Circuit Racing Series drivers